Emperor of the Black Runes is the fourth album by Domine.  It was recorded in May 2003 and  released under Japanese label Avalon in February 2004.

Track listing
All tracks by Enrico Paoli

 "Overture Mortale (Intro)" - 01:09
 "Battle Gods" - 04:58
 "Arioch, the Chaos Star" - 05:06	
 "The Aquilonia Suite Part I" - 11:01
 "The Prince in the Scarlet Robe" - 06:53	
 "Icarus Ascending" - 06:29
 "The Song of the Swords" - 05:41
 "The Sun of the New Season" -	08:41
 "True Believer" - 05:58
 "The Forest of Light" - 03:28
Bonus song
 "Altar of the King" (Riot cover, Japanese bonus track) – 4:54

Personnel

Band
 Enrico Paoli - guitars
 Riccardo Paoli - bass
 Morby - vocals
 Riccardo Iacono - keyboards
 Stefano Bonini - drums

Guests
 Leanan Sidhe - vocals on "Stormbringer Ruler" and "Emperor Of The Black Runes"
 Patrick Wire - narration on "Emperor Of The Black Runes"

Lyrical references
Source from Domine interview with Strutterzine.
 “The Aquilonia Suite” is based on the Conan The Barbarian books by R.E. Howard
 “Overture Mortale” and “Battle Gods” are, musically inspired by a theme from Mozart’s Don Juan & lyrically by the movie The Legend of Zu
  “Arioch, The Chaos Star” is lyrically loosely based on Michael Moorcock’s books
 “Icarus Ascending” is based on the Greek myth of Icarus
 “The Prince In The Scarlet Robe” is based on the Corum saga by Michael Moorcock
 “The Song Of The Sword” is based on the character of Elric of Melniboné
 “The Forest Of Light” is very loosely inspired by the theme of Tanelorn

References

2004 albums
Domine albums